Bryan Davis (born December 31, 1986) is an American professional basketball player who last played for Halcones de Ciudad Obregón of the CIBACOPA. He played college basketball for Texas A&M University.

Professional career
After going undrafted in the 2010 NBA draft, Davis played in Poland for Czarni Słupsk during the 2010–11 season. For the 2011–12 season, he played in the Ukraine for Kryvbasbasket. Following his time with Kryvbasbasket, he played in China for Hebei Springs during the 2012 NBL season.

Over the first half of the 2012–13 season, Davis spent time playing in South Korea for the Seoul Samsung Thunders and the Sonic Boom KT. In April 2013, he returned to Poland and re-joined Czarni Słupsk for the rest of the 2012–13 season. He later played for Jiang Xi during the 2013 NBL season.

In November 2013, Davis was acquired by the Reno Bighorns of the NBA Development League. In 52 games for Reno during the 2013–14 season, he averaged 9.5 points, 6.2 rebounds and 1.1 assists per game.

On May 30, 2014, Davis signed with the Wellington Saints for the rest of the 2014 New Zealand NBL season. He went on to help the Saints win the championship, and in eight games, he averaged 9.8 points, 8.8 rebounds, 1.8 assists and 1.5 steals per game.

In November 2014, Davis joined Taiwanese club Kinmen Kaoliang Liquor, and during the 2014–15 SBL season, he was named a participant in the 2015 SBL All-Star Game. In 32 games, he averaged 28.3 points, 14.5 rebounds, 2.4 assists, 2.4 steals and 1.2 blocks per game.

In March 2015, Davis signed with Capitanes de Arecibo for the 2015 BSN season. In 33 games for the club, he averaged 6.7 points, 4.6 rebounds and 1.4 steals per game.

On August 24, 2015, Davis joined the Wellington Saints Invitational team for a three-day mini camp before travelling to Taiwan to play in the 2015 William Jones Cup. In the Saints' first game of the tournament against Chinese Taipei B on August 29, Davis scored a game-high 28 points in a 102–85 win.

In November 2015, Davis joined Czarni Słupsk for a third stint, but left after just three games. He returned to Taiwan in December and joined the Dacin Tigers. He again earned All-Star honors, and in 31 games, he averaged 20.1 points, 12.1 rebounds, 2.1 assists, 2.2 steals and 1.4 blocks per game.

On May 9, 2016, Davis arrived in Wellington in order to join the Saints for the rest of the 2016 New Zealand NBL season.

In September 2016, Davis re-signed with Czarni Słupsk for a fourth stint. However, left before the start of the 2016–17 season, and on October 13, 2016, he signed a three-month contract with Belgian club Spirou Charleroi. On November 23, 2016, he left Spirou in order to sign with Taiwan Beer for the rest of the season.

Personal
Davis is a Christian. In the summer of 2009, he traveled to New Zealand with Athletes in Action, a Christian organization with a goal to build spiritual movements through sport. While there, they played an exhibition game against a New Zealand Breakers team that included Davis' future Wellington Saints teammate Corey Webster.

References

External links
Bryan Davis at fiba.com
Bryan Davis at latinbasket.com
Bryan Davis at RealGM

1986 births
Living people
African-American basketball players
American expatriate basketball people in Belgium
American expatriate basketball people in China
American expatriate basketball people in Italy
American expatriate basketball people in Lebanon
American expatriate basketball people in Malaysia
American expatriate basketball people in Mexico
American expatriate basketball people in New Zealand
American expatriate basketball people in Poland
American expatriate basketball people in South Korea
American expatriate basketball people in Taiwan
American expatriate basketball people in the Netherlands
American expatriate basketball people in Ukraine
American expatriate basketball people in Uruguay
American men's basketball players
Ángeles de Puebla (basketball) players
Basketball players from Dallas
Suwon KT Sonicboom players
Capitanes de Arecibo players
Centers (basketball)
Dutch Basketball League players
Halcones de Ciudad Obregón players
Kuala Lumpur Dragons players
Power forwards (basketball)
Reno Bighorns players
Seoul Samsung Thunders players
SC Kryvbas players
Belfius Mons-Hainaut players
Spirou Charleroi players
Texas A&M Aggies men's basketball players
Wellington Saints players
21st-century African-American sportspeople
20th-century African-American people
Taiwan Beer basketball players
Yulon Luxgen Dinos players
Dacin Tigers players
Kinmen Kaoliang Liquor basketball players
Super Basketball League imports